The Eastern line of Kolkata Suburban Railway is a public transit system serving Kolkata, West Bengal, India. It consists of total 266 stations from Howrah Junction to Barddhaman & Sealdah to Gede. The entire line is at grade. It has two sections of quadruple tracks, First section is starting from Howrah Junction and ends at Barddhaman, Katwa, Goghat, Bandel and second section is starting from Sealdah and ends at Hasnabad, Bangaon, Gede, Krishnanagar, Lalgola, Ranaghat & Naihati stations in West Bengal.

The Eastern line consists of 14 corridors, 5 Corridors in the Howrah section, and 8 corridors in the Sealdah section and there's a separate corridor in this line for joining two sections. In Howrah Section first two corridors are from Howrah Jn to Barddhaman by Mainline and the Second corridor is also from Howrah to Barddhaman by the chord line, after that, there are three branch lines, the first branch line is from Seoraphuli Junction to Goghat. The second branch line is from Bandel Jn to Katwa and the third branch line is from Barddhaman Jn to Katwa. Also in the Sealdah section, the mainline is from Sealdah to Gede which it situates on the India-Bangladesh Border, First branch line is from Ranaghat Jn to Krishnanagar City Jn, Second branch line is from Kalinarayanpur Jn to Krishnanagar City Jn via Shantipur, Third Branch line is from Ranaghat to Bangaon, fourth branch line is from Dum Dum Jn to Bangaon, Fifth branch line is from Barasat to Hasnabad, the sixth branch line is from Kalyani to Kalyani Simanta. The Bandel Naihati branch line is an important linkage for two sections of the eastern line. There is an Extension of the second branch line which starts from Krishnanagar City Junction to Lalgola.

The Major Car Sheds on this line are at Howrah, Bandel, Narkeldanga, Barasat and Ranaghat on both of the sections.

Stations with Routes

Routes
The Eastern line consists of the following sections with routes:
 Howrah section 
1) Howrah Junction – Barddhaman Junction (main)
2) Howrah Junction – Barddhaman Junction (chord line)
3) Seoraphuli Jn – Goghat
4) Bandel – Katwa
5) Barddhaman – Katwa
6) Howrah Jn – Belur Math

 Sealdah section 
1) Sealdah – Gede
2) Ranaghat Junction – Krishnanagar City Junction
3) Kalinarayanpur Junction – Shantipur – Krishnanagar City Junction
4) Kalyani – Kalyani Simanta
5) Ranaghat Jn – Bangaon Junction
6) Dum Dum Jn – Bangaon Junction
7) Barasat – Hasnabad
8) Bandel – Naihati
9) Krishnanagar City Junction – Lalgola

Stations
Names in bold indicate that the station is a fast train stop as well as important terminal.

Howrah Section

†Howrah Junction railway station is a terminus for South Eastern Railway and Eastern Railway.

Howrah Section Main line Branches
The Howrah Section main line of Eastern line, there is a bifurcation in three sections and one line bifurcates and elevates on it.

Belur Math Branch line

Chord line

West Elevated Branch line

North Branch line

North East Branch line

Sealdah Section

Sealdah Section Main line Branches
The main line branches in Sealdah Section is bifurcates into many lines:

Northern Branch line

Mid East Branch line

Kalyani Branch line

Mid North East Branch line

East Branch line

Hooghly Branch line

Far North Branch line

Electrification
From 1957, The Eastern Railway Started Electrification at Howrah - Tarakeswar Route with 1500 V DC later it was converted to 25000 V AC 50 Hz in 1967-68, after that the work goes also on the chord line, Barddhaman & Bandel To Katwa line of Howrah Division, which is now fully electrified.

And on the Sealdah Division of Eastern Railway, the electrification process was started in 1963 from Sealdah to Ranaghat line, Dum Dum To Bangaon and the other lines in this division with the different phases and completed up to 1965 from that time the whole division is also fully electrified.

Services
Currently in 2017-18 all services of the Eastern line running on 9 and 12 Cars. Sealdah section has 461 Services of 9 rakes EMU and 452 Services of 12 Rakes EMU and also on Howrah Section has  398 Services of 12 Rakes EMU. Which It Handles the 100% Suburban Network of Eastern Railways.

See also
 Kolkata Suburban Railway
 List of Kolkata Suburban Railway stations
 Eastern Railway zone

References

Kolkata Suburban Railway lines
Railway lines opened in 1853
Transport in Kolkata
Rail transport in Howrah
Transport in Purba Bardhaman district
Eastern Railway zone